The 1998 Save Mart/Kragen 350 was the 16th stock car race of the 1998 NASCAR Winston Cup Series season and the 10th iteration of the event. The race was held on Sunday, June 28, 1998, in Sonoma, California, at the club layout in Sears Point Raceway, a  permanent road course layout. The race took the scheduled 112 laps to complete. Hendrick Motorsports driver Jeff Gordon would lead a charge from 20th to the lead within the closing laps of the race to take his 33rd career NASCAR Winston Cup Series victory and his fourth of the season. To fill out the podium, Morgan–McClure Motorsports driver Bobby Hamilton and Petty Enterprises driver John Andretti would finish second and third, respectively.

Background 

Sears Point Raceway is one of two road courses to hold NASCAR races, the other being Watkins Glen International. The Chute was only used for NASCAR events such as this race, and was criticized by many drivers, who preferred the full layout.

Entry list 

 (R) denotes rookie driver.

Practice

First practice 
The first practice session was held on Friday, June 23, at 10:00 AM PST. The session would last for three hours.

Final practice 
The final practice session, sometimes referred to as Happy Hour, was held on Saturday, June 24, at 8:00 AM PST. The session would last for one hour and 15 minutes.

Qualifying 
Qualifying was split into two rounds. The first round was held on Friday, June 19, at 2:00 PM PST. Each driver would have one lap to set a time. During the first round, the top 25 drivers in the round would be guaranteed a starting spot in the race. If a driver was not able to guarantee a spot in the first round, they had the option to scrub their time from the first round and try and run a faster lap time in a second round qualifying run, held on Saturday, June 20, at 10:00 AM PST. As with the first round, each driver would have one lap to set a time. On January 24, 1998, NASCAR would announce that the amount of provisionals given would be increased from last season. Positions 26-36 would be decided on time, while positions 37-43 would be based on provisionals. Six spots are awarded by the use of provisionals based on owner's points. The seventh is awarded to a past champion who has not otherwise qualified for the race. If no past champion needs the provisional, the next team in the owner points will be awarded a provisional.

Six drivers would fail to qualify: Tommy Kendall, Dave Marcis, Todd Bodine, Rick Ware, and Chris Raudman.

Full qualifying results 

*Time not available.

Race results

Notes

References 

1998 NASCAR Winston Cup Series
NASCAR races at Sonoma Raceway
June 1998 sports events in the United States
1998 in sports in California